The O-Jolle was an event on the 2018 Vintage Yachting Games program at Copenhagen, Denmark. Six out of the eight scheduled races were completed. Seven sailors, on seven boats, from two nations entered.

Venue overview

Race area and Course
Both of the course areas on the Øresund in front of Hellerup were available for the O-Jolle event. In all cases the Alpha course area was used.

Wind conditions 
The Øresund in front of the Hellerup Sejlklub was during the 2018 Vintage Yachting Games one of the targets of the remains of the Hurricane Florence. This resulted in South-Westerly winds that varied between 12–38 knots over the period of the Vintage.
Course area Alpha was more in the open sea. With the South-Westerly winds this meant more wind and more waves. Also the wind was more stable and predictable then closer to shore.

Races

Summary 
In the O-Jolle six out of the planned eight races were completed.

The O-Jolle class (Olympic in 1936) brought several Dutch and European Champions to the Vintage. The first three races were dominated by Thies Bosch. When Thies encountered some material breakage the races were open again.

Results 

 dnc = did not compete
 dnf = did not finish
 Crossed out results did not count for the total result.

Daily standings

Victors

Notes
Information about the Vintage Yachting Classes (former Olympic classes) can be verified by:
 IOC
 World Sailing
 Nederlands Scheepvaartmuseum Amsterdam
 Vintage Yachting Games Organization

Information about the organization, conditions, sailors and results can be verified by:
 Manage 2 Sail
 Twaalf Voets Jollen Club
 Admiralty 12' Dinghy (International Rule)
 International Olympiajol Union
 International Soling Association

References

2018 Vintage Yachting Games